Morris Dale Steevens (born October 7, 1940), is an American former professional baseball left-handed pitcher, who played in Major League Baseball (MLB) for the Chicago Cubs and Philadelphia Phillies (–).

Morrie attended Salem High School in Salem, Illinois. He was signed as a undrafted free agent by the Chicago Cubs in 1958.

Steevens' ten-year pro career began in 1958, and he made the Cubs' 28-man early-season roster out of spring training in 1962. He went unscored upon in four April relief appearances (covering 3 innings pitched) before being sent back to the Double-A San Antonio Missions, for whom he won 15 games. The Cubs then recalled him in September and used him in eight games, including his only big-league starting assignment. On September 19 he went 3 innings against the Phillies at Connie Mack Stadium, permitted four earned runs, and was charged with the loss in a game shortened by rain. Those were the only runs allowed by the rookie Steevens in 15 innings pitched for the 1962 Cubs.

But Steevens spent all of 1963 back in the minor leagues and was traded to the Phillies, during the off-season. After a sparkling 8–1 season with the Triple-A Arkansas Travelers, he was recalled by the first-place Phils as an extra bullpen arm for the stretch drive. In his first relief appearance, on September 19, 1964 (two years to the day after his only MLB start), Steevens came into a 3–3 road game against the Los Angeles Dodgers in the bottom of the 16th inning in relief of Jack Baldschun to face left-handed-hitting Ron Fairly with runners at second and third base and two outs. But before he could retire Fairly, Willie Davis, the runner at third, stole home, to give the Dodgers a 4–3 victory. The Phillies recovered to win the next game, but then dropped ten games in a row to fall from the National League (NL) lead and finish second to the St. Louis Cardinals. Steevens appeared in three more games during the catastrophic losing streak, allowing one earned run in 2 innings pitched.

Morris then split 1965 between Triple-A and the Phils, and appeared in six more big-league games. He posted a poor 16.88 earned run average (ERA), again in only 2 innings of work. Morris then spent  and  back in the minors before deciding to retire from the game.

All told, Steevens lost his only two MLB decisions. In 22 games and 20 innings pitched, he gave up 20 hits and 16 bases on balls. He struck out 11 batters.

References

External links

Morrie Steevens at SABR (Baseball BioProject)

1940 births
Living people
Amarillo Gold Sox players
Arkansas Travelers players
Baseball players from Illinois
Chicago Cubs players
Lancaster Red Roses players
Major League Baseball pitchers
Paris Lakers players
People from Salem, Illinois
Philadelphia Phillies players
Phoenix Giants players
Pulaski Cubs players
Reading Phillies players
St. Cloud Rox players
Salt Lake City Bees players
San Antonio Missions players
San Diego Padres (minor league) players